James William Webb-Jones (1904 – 1965) was a Welsh choral conductor, educator, and cricketer.

Family and early life
James William, who was born in Cowbridge, Glamorgan, Wales, was the only child of the trans-European steamship agent Ernest William Jones (1870 – 1941), who was the owner of M. Jones and Brothers (est. 1856) and who was a first-class cricketer. James William's mother was Aimée Elizabeth Parson (1873 – 1913), who was the French-born daughter of James Holmes Parson who was a British merchant banker in Italy. James William's parents were married at the British Consulate in Rouen, Haute Normandie, on 10 September 1900. 

James William's uncles included the gynaecologist Arthur Webb-Jones, and Edwin Price Jones, who was Vice-Consul for Chile and Secretary to the Chamber of Commerce. James William was (through his cousin William (Bill) Wynn Jones who was Anglican Bishop of Central Tanganyika) a cousin of the National Party conservative Naomi Wilson OAM (b. 1940). James William descended (through his mother Aimée Parson) from the Georgian property-developer James Burton, who was the father of the architect Decimus Burton.

Education
James William was educated at Cranleigh School, for which he played cricket, and at Worcester College, Oxford, where he was Captain of Cricket. He later attended the University of Grenoble in France, where he received the Diplôme de Hautes Études.

James William's father Ernest, and his cousin William, and his son-in-law Peter, were members of the Jesters Cricket Club, which was founded in 1928 by John 'Jock' Forbes Burnet (1910 - 1980) of St. Paul's School, London. James William played for the Jesters, alongside his father, against the Eton College Servants, in 1931, and, alongside his cousin William, against Chertsey, also in 1931.

Career
 Assistant Headmaster of St George's School, Windsor Castle, from 1928 to 1934.
Headmaster of St George's School, Windsor Castle, from 1934 to 1942.
He left St George's School in 1942, to serve in the Royal Air Force during World War II, from 1942 to 1945.
 Housemaster, Wellington School, Somerset, from 1945 to 1950.
 Headmaster of Vanbrugh Castle School from 1951 to 1955.
 Headmaster of Wells Cathedral School from 1955 to 1964, where Peter Stanley Lyons was Director of Music from 1954 to 1960.

Marriage

James William married, at the Parish Church, Windsor, on 20 December 1930, Barbara Bindon Moody (1903 - 1973), of Emperor's Gate, South Kensington, who was the daughter of Colonel Richard Stanley Hawks Moody CB and the granddaughter of Major-General Richard Clement Moody (who was the founder and the first Lieutenant-Governor of British Columbia). James Webb-Jones and Barbara Moody had only one child, Bridget (b. 5 September 1937), who married the chorister Peter Stanley Lyons at Wells Cathedral in 1957. The godmother of Bridget Webb-Jones was Lady Walford Davies, who was the wife of the composer Sir Henry Walford Davies KCVO OBE, who had been Master of the King's Music at St George's Chapel, Windsor, when James Webb-Jones had been Headmaster of St George's School, Windsor Castle. Lady Walford Davies later married Julian Harold Legge Lambart, who was Vice-Provost of Eton College, for which Witham Hall School became a preparatory school.

Retirement and death
James William and his wife, Barbara, retired to Witham Hall, where his son-in-law Peter Stanley Lyons was Headmaster of the School. Webb-Jones's hobbies were cricket, and fives, and fishing, and wine. Webb-Jones kept a wine store in the basement of Vanbrugh Castle, and died, possibly as a consequence of alcoholism, at Witham Hall in 1965, and is buried at The Church of St. Andrew, Witham on the Hill. His wife lived at Witham Hall until her death in 1973, after which she was buried next to her husband.

Further reading

References 

People educated at Cranleigh School
Alumni of Worcester College, Oxford
Grenoble Alpes University alumni
Royal Air Force personnel of World War II
English choral conductors
British male conductors (music)
People from Cowbridge
Cricketers from the Vale of Glamorgan
Welsh cricketers
1904 births
1965 deaths
20th-century British conductors (music)